Just Dance 2023 Edition is a 2022 dance rhythm game developed and published by Ubisoft. It was unveiled on September 10, 2022 during the Ubisoft Forward September 2022 web presentation as the fourteenth main installment and the last installment of the Just Dance series to be released annually, after the series switched into a live service format, and was released on November 22, 2022, for Nintendo Switch, PlayStation 5, and Xbox Series X/S.

Just Dance 2023 Edition was also initially set to be released for Stadia, however, Stadia was announced to be shutting down on January 18, 2023, thus cancelling the Stadia version of the game.

Gameplay

As with the previous installments of the franchise, players must mimic the on-screen dancer's choreography to a chosen song using the game's associated smartphone app (Nintendo Switch players have the option to use the console's Joy-Con controllers).

The game's user interface was redesigned, which emulates those seen on streaming services, such as Netflix, Hulu or Disney+. A new online multiplayer feature is added, where up to six players can join a private group with cross-play support at launch, with the Xbox Series X/S version being later supported. Dancer cards, an in-game tool to express yourself and how you are doing in-game, received a major overhaul, with avatars now pictures of the coaches instead of their heads, and emotes are added to show how the players feel after each song. Score feedback animations can now be customized and a toggleable option. The game added victory celebrations, used for when the player finishes the song in single player or wins the song in multiplayer. Cross-progression is a new feature to the Just Dance series, allowing players to progress through multiple consoles.

A story-based playlist, titled "Enter the Danceverses", focuses on Sara, who is transported to the "Danceverse" by Wanderlust via an anthropomorphic disco ball that is dropped into the real world through her TV, and follows him on a quest to save the Danceverse from the Night Swan, as they try to recruit Brezziana and Mihaly to form a group of coaches known as the "Just Dancers", with Jack Rose (who is implied to be the Night Swan's son) initially serving as a member of the Night Swan's army, before joining the others following the Night Swan's defeat in a dance battle for one final dance. After their final dance, Wanderlust sends Sara back to the real world.

Soundtrack
The following songs appear on Just Dance 2023 Edition:

Year 1

Just Dance+ 
Just Dance+ is a new subscription service launched alongside 2023 Edition. Similar to Just Dance Unlimited from the previous six games, it offers subscription-based access to a streaming library of songs (150 songs at launch) from previous Just Dance games alongside new exclusive tracks. Recently ported classic and new exclusive tracks will be added to the service through updates.

Legacy tracks
Songs from previous Just Dance installments and previously featured on Unlimited ported to the service (besides the 150 songs already available at launch) include:

Exclusive tracks
Songs exclusive to the service include:

Reception 

Just Dance 2023 Edition has received "generally favorable reviews", according to Metacritic.

Future
In an interview with JB Hi-Fi in November 2022, Just Dance brand director Amelie Louvet confirmed that 2023 Edition would be the final annual installment in the main series, with all post-launch content, including new songs, game modes and features, being added to the game through online updates "throughout the months and years following launch".

References

External links

2022 video games
Cancelled Stadia games
Dance video games
Fitness games
Just Dance (video game series)
Music video games
PlayStation 5 games
Nintendo Switch games
Ubisoft games
Video games developed in France
Xbox Series X and Series S games